Baikunthpur or Baikunthapur may refer to several places in India:

 Baikunthpur, Koriya, town in Chhattisgarh
 Baikunthpur, Rewa, town in Madhya Pradesh
 Baikunthpur (Vidhan Sabha constituency), an assembly constituency in Gopalganj district in the state of Bihar
 Baikunthapur, a village in Cooch Behar district, West Bengal
 Baikunthapur, Paschim Medinipur, a village in Paschim Medinipur district, West Bengal